Camillo Jerusalem (3 April 1914 – 1 August 1979) was an Austrian football player. He played for Austria Wien, Sochaux, Roubaix-Tourcoing, Colmar, Besançon and Servette. He also coached Grenchen.

References

External links
 Austria Wien archive 
 

1914 births
1979 deaths
Austrian footballers
Austria international footballers
FK Austria Wien players
FC Sochaux-Montbéliard players
Racing Besançon players
Ligue 1 players
Ligue 2 players
Servette FC players
Austrian expatriate footballers
Expatriate footballers in France
Expatriate footballers in Switzerland
Austrian football managers
CO Roubaix-Tourcoing players
Association football midfielders
Association football forwards
SR Colmar players
Footballers from Vienna